The House at 23–25 Prout Street in Quincy, Massachusetts, is a well-preserved local example of worker housing for people employed in the local granite industry.  A fine example of a "Quincy Cottage", it is a -story wood-frame structure with clapboard siding and a side-gable roof.  It has a projecting gabled entrance vestibule, and twin shed-roof wall dormers, both of which are detailed with decorative wooden shingles.  The front roof eave has Italianate brackets.  This house was built by Barnabas Clark, a major investor in the granite quarries, to house workers.

The house was listed on the National Register of Historic Places in 1989.

See also
National Register of Historic Places listings in Quincy, Massachusetts

References

Houses completed in 1880
Houses in Quincy, Massachusetts
National Register of Historic Places in Quincy, Massachusetts
Houses on the National Register of Historic Places in Norfolk County, Massachusetts